Giuseppe Valle (15 March 1904 – 25 September 1990) was an Italian water polo player. He competed in the men's tournament at the 1924 Summer Olympics.

See also
 Italy men's Olympic water polo team records and statistics
 List of Olympic champions in men's water polo

References

External links
 

1904 births
1990 deaths
Italian male water polo players
Olympic water polo players of Italy
Water polo players at the 1924 Summer Olympics
Water polo players from Genoa